The Aberdare Urban District Council was established in 1894 and covered the parish of Aberdare. Its responsibilities included public health, sanitation, roads and public works generally.

There were five wards, namely Aberaman (also known as No. 5 Ward), Blaengwawr (also known as No. 4 Ward), Gadlys (also known as No. 2 Ward), Llwydcoed (also known as No. 1 Ward), and the Town Ward (also known as No. 3 Ward).  At this time, one member was elected from each ward on an annual basis.

An election was held in April 1909. It was preceded by the 1908 election and followed by the 1910 election. The term of office of members elected at the 1906 election came to an end and those elected were to serve until 1912.

Four of the five wards were uncontested, with Labour candidates becoming increasingly the dominant force as they took a seat at Gadlys for the first time.

(*) denotes sitting member

Results

Aberaman Ward

Blaengwawr Ward

Gadlys Ward

Llwydcoed Ward

Town Ward

References

Bibliography
 
 
 

1909
1909 Welsh local elections